is a 2018 Japanese television drama, starring Kento Yamazaki, Mugi Kadowaki, Mackenyu, Yuko Araki, Jun Shison and Masaki Suda. It aired on Sundays at 22:30 (JST) on NTV from January 7, 2018.

The short series titled  is distributed exclusively via Hulu. The series is 9-minutes length episodes that are told from other characters's perspectives after Eight is kissed and/or dies, as well as 'what if' stories where the characters decide to do things differently from the original series.

Cast 
 Kento Yamazaki as Otaro Dojima / Eight
 Mugi Kadowaki as Saiko Sato (Kissing Woman)
 Mackenyu as Takauji Namiki
 Yuko Araki as Mikoto Namiki
 Hayato Sano as Hiroyuki Hasebe
 Jun Shison as Kazuma Osanai	
 Masaki Suda (special appearance) as Kazunori Harumi	
 Hio Miyazawa as Michinari Hotei		
 Akane Hotta as Nao Mori	
 Erika Karata as Marin Aota
 Ai Yamamoto as Nanako Koyanagi	
 Yoshinori Okada as Koichi Nezu	
 Ken Mitsuishi as Akira Dojima		
 Kaoru Okunuki as Mitsuyo Dojima		
 Tomohisa Yuge as Tsuji
 Meikyo Yamada as Takeru Namiki		
 Hitomi Takahashi as Kyoko Namiki		
 Mantaro Koichi as Gunji Arai

References

External links
  

Japanese drama television series
2018 Japanese television series debuts
2018 Japanese television series endings
Nippon TV dramas